Not to be confused with Felice Antonio Casoni (1559-1634)

Felice Cassone (5 May 1815 Pontestura - 22 October 1854 Torino), was an Italian botanist and physician from the Piedmont region, notable for being the author of "Flora medico-farmaceutica", a 6-volume work published in Torino with typography by Giuseppe Cassone between 1847 and 1852.

Felice Cassone also published "Iconografia Vegetale" in 2 volumes between 1847-49.

Download site
 "Flora medico-farmaceutica"

References

1815 births
1854 deaths
Botanical illustrators
19th-century Italian botanists